Elise Wortley (born 1990) is a British explorer who uses equipment and clothing from the early 1900s for her journeys.

Inspired by early 20th century French explorer and author Alexandra David-Néel, Wortley has re-created several of David-Néel's journeys, including Kangchenjunga in the Himalayas, Lhasa in Tibet, the Scottish Highlands, the Alborz mountains in Iran, and the Ben Nevis mountain in Scotland.

References 

Living people
1990 births
Female explorers